My House in Umbria is a 2003 American made-for-television drama mystery film, based on the 1991 novella of the same name by William Trevor and published along with another novella in the volume Two Lives. The film stars Maggie Smith and Chris Cooper, and was directed by Richard Loncraine.

Plot
Emily Delahunty (Maggie Smith) is an eccentric British romance novelist who lives in Umbria in central Italy, where she runs a pensione for tourists. Mrs Delahunty settled in Italy to flee from a somewhat traumatic past which still haunts her, and lives alone apart from a few servants and her manager Quinty (Timothy Spall). One day while taking a shopping trip to Milano, the train she is on is bombed by terrorists. After she wakes up in a hospital, she invites three of the other survivors of the disaster to stay at her villa for recuperation. Of these are "the General" (Ronnie Barker) a retired British Army veteran, Werner (Benno Fürmann), a young German photographer, and Aimee (Emmy Clarke), a young American girl who has now become mute after her parents were both killed in the explosion.

As the group recover from their ordeal (in which the General lost his daughter, and Werner lost his girlfriend and suffered considerable burns to his arm and torso), the explosion is being investigated by Inspector Girotti (Giancarlo Giannini), a local policeman. Responding to the warmth and kindness of Mrs Delahunty and the others, Aimee begins to speak again, while the local authorities seek out any relatives who might be able to take her in. They eventually locate her uncle, Thomas Riversmith (Chris Cooper), a university professor in the US. He agrees to take Aimee back to the USA to live with his wife and himself, though they have little time for (and no experience with) raising children and are particularly concerned about trying to raise a child who has been through such a traumatic experience. Via flashbacks it is revealed that Mrs. Delahunty was an orphan who was molested as a child by her adoptive father. At a young age she fled England with a travelling salesman and spent years living as a prostitute before Quinty convinced her to move to Italy.

Mrs Delahunty grows to like her new housemates and invites the General and Werner to stay indefinitely. She also works hard to find common ground with Aimee's uncle and tries to convince him to leave Aimee with her in Italy rather than taking the child back to America to a loveless home. Meanwhile, Inspector Girotti discovers that Werner was involved in the terrorist attack on the train. Mrs Delahunty reluctantly admits that she has come to the same conclusion, but Werner departs in secret before he can be confronted. Although disappointed by the revelation, Mrs Delahunty is delighted to learn that the General intends to stay on and that Thomas has allowed Aimee to remain as well. The film ends with Mrs Delahunty embracing her new circumstances, having finally resolved her inner turmoil.

The plot departs substantially from that of William Trevor's somber novella.

Cast
 Maggie Smith as Mrs. Emily Delahunty
 Chris Cooper as Thomas Riversmith
 Timothy Spall as Quinty
 Emmy Clarke as Aimee
 Ronnie Barker as The General
 Benno Fürmann as Werner
 Giancarlo Giannini as Inspector Girotti
 Libero De Rienzo as Dr. Innocenti
 Cecilia Dazzi as Rosa Crevelli

Production
 Much of the film was made on location in Italy, including Cinecittà, Rome, Lazio, Siena and Tuscany.

Awards
 Primetime Emmy Awards
 Outstanding Made for Television Movie (nominated)
 Outstanding Lead Actress in a Miniseries or Movie (Smith, won)
 Outstanding Supporting Actor in a Miniseries or Movie (Cooper, nominated)
 Outstanding Directing for a Miniseries, Movie, or Dramatic Special (nominated)
 Outstanding Writing for a Miniseries, Movie, or Dramatic Special (nominated)
 Outstanding Art Direction for a Miniseries, Movie, or Special (nominated)
 Outstanding Casting for a Miniseries, Movie, or Special (nominated)
 Outstanding Costumes for a Miniseries, Movie, or Special (nominated)
 Outstanding Hairstyling for a Miniseries, Movie, or Special (nominated)
 Golden Globe Awards
 Best Mini-Series or Motion Picture Made for Television (nominated)
 Best Performance by an Actress in a Mini-Series or Motion Picture Made for Television (Smith, nominated)

External links

 

2003 television films
2003 films
2003 crime drama films
American crime drama films
Crime television films
American drama television films
HBO Films films
Television shows based on Irish novels
Films with screenplays by Hugh Whitemore
Films based on works by William Trevor
Films directed by Richard Loncraine
Films set in Italy
2000s American films